The following lists of mines in Canada are subsidiaries to the list of mines article and lists working, defunct and future mines in the country and is organised by the primary mineral output and province. For practical purposes stone, marble and other quarries may be included in this list.

By province

Alberta
British Columbia
Manitoba
New Brunswick
Newfoundland & Labrador
Northwest Territories
Nova Scotia
Nunavut
Ontario
Prince Edward Island
Quebec
Saskatchewan
Yukon

By product
Coal
Gold
Nickel
Potash

References